The 1998–99 Canadian network television schedule indicates the fall prime time schedules for Canada's major English and French broadcast networks.

1998 official fall schedule

Sunday

Monday

Tuesday

Wednesday

Thursday

Friday

Saturday

References
 Fall Preview '98, Ottawa Citizen, TVtimes, 5 September 1998
 
 Listings, TVtimes, Ottawa Citizen, 17 October 1998 to 13 March 1999

External links 
 CBC Television: Annual Report 1998-99

1998 in Canadian television
1999 in Canadian television
Canadian television schedules